Wolfgang Schmidt (born ) is a German politician and jurist who has been serving as Federal Minister for Special Affairs, Head of the Chancellery and Commissioner for the Federal Intelligence Services since 2021. He was previously State Secretary at the Federal Ministry of Finance under Minister Olaf Scholz in the government of Chancellor Angela Merkel from 2018 to 2021.

Schmidt has been a close associate of Scholz since 2002 and is considered his spin doctor.

Early life and education
Schmidt was born 23 September 1970, in Hamburg. He studied law at the University of Hamburg as well as the University of the Basque Country from 1991, graduating with his first state examination by 1997. Thereafter, he worked as Research associate at the University of Hamburg until 2000. Schmidt then served a two-year legal clerkship term at the Hanseatic Higher Regional Court until 2002, when he completed his second state examination.

Career
From 2002 until 2005, Schmidt worked as advisor and later as chief of staff to Olaf Scholz in his capacity as the SPD’s secretary general. He followed Scholz as chief of staff when the latter was appointed as whip of the SPD parliamentary group.

In the government of Chancellor Angela Merkel, Schmidt again served as Scholz’s chief of staff at the Federal Ministry of Labour and Social Affairs.

From 2010 to 2011, Schmidt served as director of the International Labour Organization (ILO) representative office in Germany.

Political career
Schmidt joined the youth organization of the Social Democratic Party, called the Jusos, in 1989 due to his interest in the third world.

On 6 December 2021, Schmidt was nominated as Federal Minister for Special Affairs and Head of the Chancellery in Scholz's cabinet, and was inaugurated by President Frank-Walter Steinmeier on 8 December.

Since taking office, Schmidt has been described in news medias as "Olaf Scholz’s shadow foreign minister." Early in his tenure, he became a key architect of the policies outlines in Scholz’s Zeitenwende speech. In February 2023, he appeared in parliament for the first time, explaining and defending the government’s policies in a 90-minute question-and-answer session.

Other activities

International organizations
 Asian Infrastructure Investment Bank (AIIB), Ex-Officio Alternate Member of the Board of Governors (2018–2021)
 Multilateral Investment Guarantee Agency (MIGA), World Bank Group, Ex-Officio Alternate Member of the Board of Governors (2018–2021)
 World Bank, Ex-Officio Alternate Member of the Board of Governors (2018–2021)

Corporate boards
 KfW, ex-officio Member of the Board of Supervisory Directors (2018–2021)
 German Investment Corporation (DEG), ex-officio Member of the Supervisory Board (2018–2021)

Non-profit organizations
 Baden-Badener Unternehmer-Gespräche (BBUG), Member of the Board of Trustees (since 2021)
 Business Forum of the Social Democratic Party of Germany, Member of the Advisory Board on Economic Policy (since 2020)
 German Institute for International and Security Affairs (SWP), Member of the Council (since 2018)
 Institute for European Politics (IEP), Member of the Board of Trustees

Personal life
Schmidt is married to Mexican writer Adriana Sabugal Fernández and has two daughters with whom he currently resides in Berlin.

References

1970 births
Living people
Politicians from Hamburg
21st-century German lawyers
21st-century German civil servants
21st-century German politicians
Heads of the German Chancellery
Federal government ministers of Germany
Grand Cross of the Order of Civil Merit